Bae Soo-yong (born June 7, 1998) is a South Korean football player. He plays as a defender for Chungnam Asan FC in K2 League.

Career
Bae Soo-yong joined J1 League club Gamba Osaka in 2017.   He was loaned out to J3 side Giravanz Kitakyushu ahead of the 2018 J2 League season.

Career statistics

Last update: 2 December 2018

Reserves performance

Last Updated: 9 December 2017

References

External links

1998 births
Living people
South Korean footballers
J1 League players
J3 League players
Gamba Osaka players
Gamba Osaka U-23 players
Giravanz Kitakyushu players
Kamatamare Sanuki players
Association football defenders